Nothia is an extinct genus of foraminifera described in 1964 by Pflaumann, belonging to the subfamily Bathysiphoninae and containing 5 species.

References

Foraminifera genera
Monothalamea